This is a list of cities, towns and villages in the ceremonial county of West Sussex, England. Towns and cities are shown in bold type.

A
Adversane, Albourne, Aldingbourne, Aldsworth, Aldwick, Almodington, Amberley, Ancton, Angmering, Ansty, Apuldram, Ardingly, Arundel, Ashfold, Ashington, Ashurst, Ashurst Wood, Atherington

B
Balcombe, Balls Cross, Barlavington, Barnham, Barns Green, Bedham, Bepton, Bignor, Billingshurst, Bilsham, Binderton, Birdham, Bolney, Bognor Regis, Borden, Bosham, Bosham Hoe, Botolphs, Boxgrove, Bracklesham Bay, Bramber, Broadbridge Heath, Brooks Green, Broomer's Corner, Burgess Hill, Burpham, Bury, Byworth

C
Charlton, Chichester, Chidham, Chilgrove, Chithurst, Church Norton, Clapham, Climping, Cocking, Codmore Hill, Coldwaltham, Colgate, Colworth, Compton, Coneyhurst, Coolham, Coombes, Cootham, Copsale, Copthorne, Coultershaw Bridge, Cowfold, Crabtree, Crawley, Crawley Down, Crockerhill, Cuckfield

D
Dell Quay, Dial Green, Dial Post, Didling, Donnington, Duncton, Durfold Wood, Durleighmarsh, Durrington

E
Earnley, Eartham, Easebourne, East Ashling, East Dean, East Grinstead, East Hampnett, East Harting, East Lavant, East Lavington, East Marden, East Preston, East Wittering, Eastergate, Ebernoe, Egdean, Elmer, Elsted

F
Faygate, Felpham, Fernhurst, Ferring, Findon, Fishbourne, Fishersgate, Fittleworth, Five Oaks, Flansham, Fontwell, Ford, Foul Mile, Fulking, Funtington, Fyning

G
Gay Street, Goddards Green, Goose Green, Goring by Sea, Graffham

H
Habin, Halnaker, Hammer, Hampers Green, Handcross, Hardham, Harting, Hassocks, Haywards Heath, Heath End (West Sussex), Henfield, Henley (near Fernhurst), Heyshott, Hickstead, High Salvington, Highbrook, Hill Brow,  Horsham, Horsted Keynes, Houghton, Hoyle, Hunston, Hurstpierpoint, Hurst Wickham

I
Ifield, Ifold, Iping, Itchenor, Itchingfield

K
Keymer, Kingsfold, Kingsley Green, Kingston by Ferring, Kingston by Sea, Kirdford

L
Lancing, Langley, Lavant, Lidsey, Lickfold, Linch, Linchmere, Lindfield, Littlehampton, Lodsworth, Lower Beeding, Loxwood, Lurgashall, Lyminster

M
Madehurst, Mannings Heath, Maudlin, Merston, Mid Lavant, Middleton-on-Sea, Midhurst, Milland, Monk's Gate, Minsted

N
Newtimber, North Bersted, Newpound Common, North Marden, North Horsham, North Mundham, North Stoke, Northchapel, Norton, Nutbourne (Chichester), Nutbourne (Horsham), Nuthurst, Nyewood, Nyetimber, Nyton

O
 Offham, Oving

P
Pagham, Parham, Partridge Green, Patching, Pease Pottage, Petworth, Plaistow, Plummer's Plain, Poling, Poynings, Prinsted, Pulborough, Pyecombe

Q
Quebec (West Harting)

R
Rake, Redford, River, Rogate, Rose Green, Rowhook, Rudgwick, Runcton, Rustington

S
Sayers Common, Selham, Selsey, Selsfield Common, Sharpthorne, Shermanbury, Shillinglee, Shipley, Shipton Green, Shoreham-by-Sea, Shripney, Sidlesham, Singleton, Slaugham, Slindon, Slinfold, Small Dole, Somerley, Sompting, South Ambersham, South Bersted, South Harting, South Stoke, Southbourne, Southwater, Southwick, Spear Hill, Staplefield, Stedham, Steyning, Stopham, Storrington, Stoughton, Strettington, Strood Green, Sullington, Sutton

T
Tangmere, Terwick, Terwick Common, Thakeham, Three Bridges, Tillington, Tisman's Common, Tortington, Tote Hill, Treyford, Trotton, Turners Hill, Twineham

U
Up Marden, Upper Beeding, Upperton, Upwaltham

W
Walberton, Walderton, Warnham, Warningcamp, Warninglid, Washington, Watersfield, West Ashling, West Burton, West Chiltington, West Dean, West Grinstead, West Harting, West Hoathly, West Itchenor, West Lavington, West Marden, West Preston, West Stoke, West Thorney, West Wittering, Wepham, Westbourne, Westergate, Westerton, Westhampnett, Whitemans Green, Wick, Wiggonholt, Wineham, Wisborough Green, Woodgate, Woodmancote (Horsham), Woodmancote (Chichester), Woolbeding, Worth, Worthing

Y
Yapton

See also
List of settlements in West Sussex by population
List of places in England

 Places
West Sussex
Places